Murat Yakin (born 15 September 1974) is a Swiss football coach and former player. He is the manager of the Switzerland national football team.

Playing career 
Yakin spent the longest spell of his career playing for his hometown club FC Basel, where he was the defensive linchpin, captain and libero of a team which enjoyed domestic and relative European success. He won the Swiss Super League on five occasions (1995, 1996, 2002, 2004, 2005), and the Swiss Cup three times (1994, 2002, 2003). He recalls the 2002–03 Champions League second leg qualifying match on 28 August 2002 against Celtic in St. Jakob-Park as the "match of his life". Basel won the game 2–0, with Yakin scoring the second goal in the 22-minute as Basel qualified 3–3 on the away goals rule for the 2002–03 UEFA Champions League group stage.

In 2003, he played in the FIFA "Match against Poverty" in Basel, on Ronaldo's team which won 4–3 against Zinedine Zidane's.

Yakin was capped 49 times for the Switzerland national team, representing his country at UEFA Euro 2004.

Coaching career

Early career
Yakin was appointed coach of FC Thun in 2009 after a time as a youth coach at Grasshoppers and head coach of FC Frauenfeld. Yakin led Thun to promotion in his first year as manager there, winning the Swiss Challenge League in 2010. In his second season with the club, Thun managed to finish 5th in the Swiss Super League and earned a spot in the second qualifying round of the following season's UEFA Europa League.

In May 2011, he joined FC Luzern for a reported 200,000 Swiss francs. He took over from Christian Brand, who was made caretaker after the sacking of Rolf Fringer.

Basel
On 15 October 2012, Yakin was appointed as the new manager of FC Basel. Under his management, Basel won twice, home and away, against Chelsea in the 2013–14 Champions League group stage. He praised the supporters in the stadium, saying that they pushed the team to win through the 90 minutes. He was also delighted to have received praise from then Chelsea manager José Mourinho. On 17 May 2014, FC Basel announced Yakin was no longer with the club after he guided them to two domestic titles in as many years.

Spartak Moscow 
On 16 June 2014, Yakin was appointed as manager of Russian Premier League side Spartak Moscow. According to Russian media, the deal was a long-term contract with Yakin earning an annual salary of 1.6 million euros ($2.18 million).

On 30 May 2015, after only one season with the club, his contract with the club was terminated after a mutual agreement.

Return to FC Schaffhausen 
On 17 June 2019, it was confirmed, that Yakin had returned to FC Schaffhausen as their new manager having left FC Sion previously that year.

Switzerland national team 
On 9 August 2021, Yakin was appointed as the manager of the Switzerland national team. In the 2022 World Cup qualification, Northern Ireland held reigning European champions Italy to a goalless draw, thereby ensuring that Switzerland qualified for the tournament and Italy had to play in the playoffs. In gratitude, he sent 9.3 kg of Swiss chocolate to the Irish Football Association. In the 2022 FIFA World Cup, he led Switzerland to finish second in their group, in order to qualify to the round of 16, where they lost 6–1 to Portugal.

Personal life 
Yakin is the elder brother of Hakan Yakin, who was also a professional footballer with successful stints at Grasshoppers, Basel, and BSC Young Boys and represented Switzerland at international level also. Yakin is of Turkish descent.

Managerial statistics

Honours

As a player 
Basel
 Swiss Super League: 2001–02, 2003–04, 2004–05
 Swiss Cup: 2001–02, 2002–03

Individual
 Swiss Young Player of the Year: 1994
 Axpo Swiss Super Leaguer Player of the Year: 2002

As a manager 
Thun
 Swiss Challenge League: 2009–10

Basel
 Swiss Super League: 2012–13, 2013–14

References

External links

 
  
 Murat Yakin on the website of FC Basel
 Article detailing Murat's connection with two of his passions: kebabs and Turkish rap 

1974 births
Living people
Swiss people of Turkish descent
Swiss men's footballers
Footballers from Basel
Association football defenders
Switzerland international footballers
UEFA Euro 2004 players
Bundesliga players
Swiss Super League players
Süper Lig players
Fenerbahçe S.K. footballers
FC Concordia Basel players
FC Basel players
1. FC Kaiserslautern players
VfB Stuttgart players
Grasshopper Club Zürich players
Swiss football managers
Russian Premier League managers
FC Frauenfeld managers
FC Thun managers
FC Luzern managers
FC Basel managers
FC Basel non-playing staff
FC Spartak Moscow managers
FC Schaffhausen managers
Grasshopper Club Zürich managers
Switzerland national football team managers
Swiss expatriate footballers
Swiss expatriate football managers
Swiss expatriate sportspeople in Germany
Expatriate footballers in Germany
Swiss expatriate sportspeople in Russia
Expatriate football managers in Russia
2022 FIFA World Cup managers